The 2009–10 Bahrain 1st GP2 Asia round was the third round of the 2009-10 GP2 Asia Series season. It was held on February 26 and 27, 2010 at Bahrain International Circuit at Sakhir, Bahrain, together with 2010 V8 Supercar Championship Series 2010 Desert 400. It was the first of two rounds to be held at the circuit, the other being the 2009-10 Bahrain 2nd GP2 Asia round. The layout used for this Race will not be used for the following event, as it acts as a F1 Support race.

Report

Race 1 
Despite Jules Bianchi starting on Pole, Davide Valsecchi clinched the GP2 Asia title with three rounds to spare by winning in the Bahrain feature race. The iSport driver lurked in third for most of the distance, before mounting another late surge which has become his characteristic this year, to overcome Arden's Javier Villa and Meritus' Luca Filippi and claim his third victory in five rounds. With Valsecchi's nearest rival and team-mate Oliver Turvey delayed in the pits and unable to score, the win gave Valsecchi an insurmountable points lead. Filippi and Villa burst from the second row into the lead at the start, while polesitter Jules Bianchi (ART) immediately fell out of contention for victory for a very poor start. Villa looked faster than Filippi in the opening laps, but with no way past on track, he dived in for an early stop. The extra speed on fresh tyres paid dividends for Villa, and by the time the pitstops were complete he was in the lead ahead of Filippi and Valsecchi.

As has been the case throughout the championship, Valsecchi got quicker and quicker as the race progressed. An initial dive-bomb move on Filippi for second saw him skitter over the run-off at the Turn 10 hairpin, but he quickly regrouped and passed his countryman into Turn 1 with six laps to go. He then caught Villa in just one lap and took the lead with a straightforward outbraking move - only to then run wide at Turn 10 later in the lap and hand first place back again. It was only a brief respite for Villa though, as Valsecchi soon repassed him into the first corner and pulled away to secure victory. Villa lost more pace as his tyres faded, allowing Filippi to drive around the outside of him and take second. DPR's Giacomo Ricci came within 0.2 seconds of depriving Villa of third too as they diced on the final lap. Charles Pic took the second Arden car to fifth ahead of Coloni's returnee Alvaro Parente and Addax's Sergio Pérez. Adrian Zaugg got quicker throughout the race on his return with Trident, charging past Turvey and Bianchi in the closing stages to claim eighth and pole for race two. Turvey had lost several places in his pitstop with a wheelgun problem while Bianchi never got up to speed after dropping down the order at the start.

Race 2 
In race 2 Charles Pic earned his first GP2 Asia/GP2 win by breaking away from the early chaos in the Bahrain Sprint race. The Frenchman overtook initial leader Adrian Zaugg and then escaped from his pursuers while they spent the next few laps tripping over each other. For much of the race it looked like Arden would score a one-two, with Pic's team-mate Javier Villa all over the back of second placed Giacomo Ricci. But the latter picked up his pace later on and charged away to secure DPR's third podium finish in the last two events. Having gained pole position on the partially reversed grid thanks to his eighth place yesterday, Zaugg (Trident) led into the first corners while Coloni's Alvaro Parente and Addax's Sergio Pérez fought for second. The pair ended up banging wheels approaching Turn 4, leaving Pérez with a broken wing and sending Parente spinning into the barriers as his apparently wounded car broke loose on the following downhill sweeps. There was more contact further down the pack, and newly crowned champion Davide Valsecchi (iSport) had to pit for a new wing, while race one podium finisher Luca Filippi (Meritus) spun down the order. Leader Zaugg did not have the pace to pull away and soon had Pic, Ricci, ART's fast-starting Jules Bianchi and Villa queuing up behind him.

Pic dived ahead at the end of the backstraight on lap four, with Ricci then following him in the next corner. As Zaugg tried to fight back, Bianchi got alongside him as well, with all three cars wheel to wheel through the last turn, down the pitstraight and into the first complex - where it ended in tears as contact damaged Zaugg and Bianchi's cars. That settled the top three positions, Pic having pulled clear and Ricci eventually dropping Villa and securing second. Rapax's Daniel Zampieri had emerged from the mayhem in fourth, but was hunted down as the race progressed - Sam Bird (ART) and Edoardo Piscopo (DAMS) demoting him in the closing stages. Zampieri then handed the final point to iSport's Oliver Turvey when he ran wide while trying to fend off the Briton with two laps to go, and also dropped behind his charging Rapax team-mate Vladimir Arabadzhiev. Turvey's sixth place ensured that iSport wrapped up the teams' title alongside Valsecchi's drivers' crown. Among the other incidents in the race, Meritus driver Alexander Rossi received a ten place grid penalty for the next round after forcing Ocean's Fabio Leimer off the track. The American eventually broke his front wing on the back of Leimer's car and then slid into Coloni's Will Bratt, ending both their races early.

See also 
 2010 Desert 400

GP2 Asia
GP2 Asia Series